Anneliese Kaplan  (12 May 1933 – 11 August 2020) was a German actress. She was married to the composer Martin Böttcher.

Selected filmography
 The Last Waltz (1953)
 Captain Bay-Bay (1953)
 Sun Over the Adriatic (1954)
 A Girl from Paris (1954)
 The Fisherman from Heiligensee (1955)
 The Abduction of the Sabine Women (1956)

References

Bibliography 
 Wolfgang Jacobsen & Hans Helmut Prinzler. Käutner. Spiess, 1992.

External links 
 

1933 births
2020 deaths
German film actresses
Actresses from Hamburg